Control Alt Delete is a 2008 comedy film.
The film is set in an information technology firm just before the year 2000. Lead programmer Lewis Henderson is in charge of solving various Y2K bugs, but finds himself increasingly distracted by his computer-mediated sexual yearnings. At first, Lewis is simply attracted to Internet pornography, but, after he is abandoned by his girlfriend, he takes an interest in having sex with the computer itself. As New Year's Day, 2000 approaches, Henderson's work and romantic issues intensify; the movie follows the protagonist as he tries to resolve both the Y2K problem and his own personal issues.

Control Alt Delete is the feature-length debut of Canadian director Cameron Labine. It stars his brother Tyler Labine, of CW's Reaper as Lewis Henderson. The film premiered at the 2008 Toronto International Film Festival. At the festival, Maximum bought the worldwide distribution rights to the film.
 
As of June 2010, the film remains unreleased, though it is being digitally distributed by Netflix via their streaming film rental service, where it has received predominantly favorable user reviews.

References

External links

2008 films
English-language Canadian films
2008 comedy films
Canadian comedy films
Films about pornography
2000s Canadian films